The Myanmar Medical Journal (formerly the Burma Medical Journal) is a peer-reviewed medical journal published in Myanmar by the Myanmar Medical Association aiming to advance medical science in Myanmar. The journal is one of three medical journals, alongside Myanmar Research Journal and Myanmar Journal of Current Medical Practice, published in the country.

It was established in 1953.  During the early post-independence years, the Burma Medical Journal was Burma's only outlet for publishing and reading medical research papers.

References

External links
 

General medical journals
Publications established in 1953
Quarterly journals
English-language journals
Academic journals published by learned and professional societies
Academic journals published in Myanmar